Suchetgarh Assembly constituency is one of the 87 constituencies in the Jammu and Kashmir Legislative Assembly of Jammu and Kashmir a north state of India. Suchetgarh is also part of Jammu Lok Sabha constituency.

Member of Legislative Assembly

Election results

2014

See also
 Jammu
 List of constituencies of Jammu and Kashmir Legislative Assembly

References

Assembly constituencies of Jammu and Kashmir
Jammu district